Wendy Elizabeth Lucas-Bull (née Adair; born 1955) is a South African businesswoman, banker and corporate executive, who served as the chairperson of Absa Group, a large pan-African financial services group, with subsidiaries in Botswana, Ghana, Kenya, Mauritius, Mozambique, Seychelles, South Africa, Tanzania, Uganda and Zambia. She retired from Absa on 31 March 2022.

Background

Wendy was born in around 1955. She graduated with a Bachelor of Science degree from the University of the Witwatersrand, in 1974.

Career

Prior to her appointment as chairman of the Absa Group in 2013, Lucas-Bull served as executive director of Rand Merchant Investment Holdings, before she served as the CEO of First Rand's retail division.

Wendy is one of the four founders and board members of the Peotona Group. Previous leadership positions in business include as non-executive directorships at Barclays, Anglo American Platinum Limited, the Development Bank of Southern Africa, Alexander Forbes, Eskom, Nedbank, Telkom, Aveng, Lafarge Industries, the South African Financial Markets Advisory Board, Discovery Holdings, Dimension Data Plc and the Momentum Group.

Other consideration
Lucas-Bull has served in the past, as a member of the President’s Advisory Council on Black Economic Empowerment.

References

External links
 Winning Women – Wendy Lucas-Bull: Bullish In the Boardroom

1955 births
Living people
Absa people
University of the Witwatersrand alumni
South African people of English descent
South African investment bankers
21st-century South African businesswomen
21st-century South African businesspeople
20th-century South African businesswomen
20th-century South African businesspeople